Eva de Goede (born 23 March 1989) is a Dutch field hockey player who played in the Dutch teams that won the gold medal in the 2008 Summer Olympics, the 2012 Summer Olympics and the 2020 Summer Olympics.  She also won a silver medal at the 2016 Summer Olympics.  She was part of the Dutch squad that won the 2007 Champions Trophy.

She plays as a midfielder for Dutch club AH&BC. At the 2018 Hockey Stars Awards, she was named the FIH Player of the Year. In February 2020 she was awarded the FIH Player of the Year for the second time in a row.

References

External links 
 

1989 births
Living people
Dutch female field hockey players
Field hockey players at the 2008 Summer Olympics
Field hockey players at the 2012 Summer Olympics
Medalists at the 2008 Summer Olympics
Medalists at the 2012 Summer Olympics
Olympic field hockey players of the Netherlands
Olympic gold medalists for the Netherlands
Olympic medalists in field hockey
People from Zeist
Field hockey players at the 2016 Summer Olympics
Field hockey players at the 2020 Summer Olympics
Medalists at the 2016 Summer Olympics
Olympic silver medalists for the Netherlands
Female field hockey midfielders
Amsterdamsche Hockey & Bandy Club players
Medalists at the 2020 Summer Olympics
Sportspeople from Utrecht (province)
20th-century Dutch women
21st-century Dutch women